The 1990–91 Wessex Football League was the fifth season of the Wessex Football League. The league champions for the first time were Havant Town, who were subsequently promoted to the Southern League.

For sponsorship reasons, the league was known as the Jewson Wessex League.

League table
The league consisted of one division of 20 clubs, increased from 19 the previous season despite Newport (IOW) having joined the Southern League. Two new clubs joined:
Ryde Sports, joining from the Hampshire League.
Swanage Town & Herston, transferring from the Western League.
Folland Sports F.C. changed their name to Aerostructures Sports & Social F.C.

References

Wessex Football League seasons
9